The 2019 Paris ePrix (formally the 2019 Paris E-Prix) was a Formula E electric car race held at the Circuit des Invalides in the Les Invalides building complex on 27 April 2019. It was the eighth race of the 2018–19 Formula E season and the fourth edition of the event.

Report

Background
The Paris ePrix was confirmed as part of Formula E's 2018–19 series schedule on June 7, 2018 by the FIA World Motor Sport Council. It is the eighth of thirteen scheduled single-seater electric car races of the 2018–19 season, and the fourth running of the event. The ePrix would be held at the  clockwise fourteen-turn Circuit des Invalides in the Les Invalides building complex of the city's 7th arrondissement on 27 April 2019.

Going into the race, Mahindra driver Jérôme d'Ambrosio is leading the Drivers' Championship with 65 points, only one point ahead of BMW Andretti driver António Félix da Costa in second. In third is the Techeetah driver André Lotterer with 62 points, two points behind the championship leader after finishing second in the previous race. Jaguar driver Mitch Evans is in forth with 61 points, after winning the race in Rome. Audi Sport Abt Schaeffler driver Lucas Di Grassi stays in fifth with 58 points after finishing seventh in Rome. In the Teams' Championship, DS Techeetah led with 116 points, only seven points ahead of Virgin Racing in second place. In third place is the Mahindra Racing with 102 points; tie on points with Audi. BMW Andretti completing the top five with 82 points.

Maximilian Günther kept his Dragon Racing seat in Paris, as Felipe Nasr is focusing his preparations for the next round of the IMSA WeatherTech SportsCar Championship.

Practice
Practice 1 took part in damp conditions early in the morning. On his very first lap Lucas Di Grassi of Audi Sport got all out of shape and put the car into the wall on the out lap. He made it back to the pits but missed the rest of the session due to the damage he sustained in the crash. DS Techeetah driver Jean-Éric Vergne also lost the car early on and spun and skated of the track and down the escape road. Sébastien Buemi of Nissan e.dams collided with Virgin Racing driver Sam Bird and consequently spun, with Bird spinning into the outside wall. Many drivers going down the escape road at Turn 3 with lock ups. Robin Frijns of the Virgin Racing pushed too hard and hit the wall on the exit of Turn 3 with Sébastien Buemi spinning and following Frijns in. Then Sam Bird hit the wall in the same place as his teammate but sustained a lot more damage and was consequently out of the session and missed the second practice due to the damage. André Lotterer in the DS Techeetah was quickest after the red flag came out and brought the session to an early end.

The second practice session took part in dry conditions on the streets of Paris. Everyone left the pits as soon as possible except Sam Bird whose car was still being worked on after his heavy crash in FP1. Alex Lynn of Jaguar Racing pushed too hard and gently put the car into the wall at slow speed and, fortunately with minimal damage was able to continue. Sébastien Buemi spun and crossed the finish line backwards as he spun through the final corner. Dragon Racing driver José María López then crashed in the same place as Alex Lynn. Carrying on his form from his win in Rome last time out Mitch Evans put his Jaguar quickest of the session with a time of a 1:00.226, followed by Oliver Rowland and Lucas Di Grassi.

Qualifying
Mitch Evans brushed the wall in group 1 qualifying and took some of the wall branding off. Jérôme d'Ambrosio was the only driver who made it from group 1 to superpole. In group 2 Robin Frijns set a strong lap to book his place in super pole. Sébastien Buemi, Oliver Rowland, Pascal Wehrlein and Felipe Massa were the other 4 drivers to make it to superpole. Wehrlein took pole position from Oliver Rowland and Sébastien Buemi.

Race
The race was started behind the safety car. After the race got going, drama started when rain appeared causing mayhem. After the rain was stopped, the drivers finally got some control of their cars after the chaos and drama that’s happened during the race

Post-race

Classification

Qualifying

Notes:
  — Pascal Wehrlein and Jérôme d'Ambrosio's lap times were deleted for tyre pressure infringement.

Race

Notes:
  — Oliver Turvey received a drive through penalty converted into a 50-second time penalty for causing a collision 
  — Jérôme d'Ambrosio received 5-second time penalty for improper use of Attack Mode.
  — Fastest lap.
  — Pole position.

Standings after the race 

Drivers' Championship standings

Teams' Championship standings

 Notes: Only the top five positions are included for both sets of standings.

References

|- style="text-align:center"
|width="35%"|Previous race:2019 Rome ePrix
|width="30%"|FIA Formula E Championship2018–19 season
|width="35%"|Next race:2019 Monaco ePrix
|- style="text-align:center"
|width="35%"|Previous race:2018 Paris ePrix
|width="30%"|Paris ePrix
|width="35%"|Next race:TBD
|- style="text-align:center"

2019
Paris ePrix
ePrix
Paris ePrix